Demirkent can refer to:

 Demirkent, Erzincan
 Demirkent, Yusufeli